Majha (Punjabi: ਮਾਝਾ (Gurmukhi),  (Shahmukhi); Mājhā) is a region located in the central parts of the historical Punjab region split between India and Pakistan. It extends north from the right banks of the river Beas, and reaches as far north as the river Jhelum. People of the Majha region are given the demonym "Mājhī" or "Majhail". Most inhabitants of the region speak the Majhi dialect, which is the basis of the standard register of the Punjabi language. The most populous city in the area is Lahore on the Pakistani side, and Amritsar on the Indian side of the border.

During the partition of India in 1947, the Majha region of Punjab was split between India and Pakistan when the Indian Punjab and Pakistani Punjab were formed. The Majha region of Indian State of Punjab covers the area between Beas and Ravi rivers, including the area on the north of Sutlej, after the confluence of Beas and Sutlej at Harike in Tarn Taran district, extending up to the Ravi River, which is all part of the Majha region in India. This region contains fourteen districts of the Pakistani province of Punjab, including the cities of Lahore, Faisalabad, Sahiwal, Pakpattan, Gujranwala, Gujrat, and Sialkot. Four districts of Indian state of Punjab – Amritsar, Tarn Taran, Gurdaspur, and Pathankot.

The people of the Majha region have been historically known for their warrior-like nature. The Majha region is called the "Sword Arm of the Country", due to it contributing disproportionately to the Officer as well as Orderly ranks of the Armies of both India and Pakistan. The Sikh Empire was founded in the Majha region, and so the region is also sometimes referred to as "the cradle of the brave Sikhs". Majha is also the birthplace of Sikhism.

History

The word "Mājhā" means the "central" or the "heartland". The Majha region is geographically located in the middle (or central part) of the historic Punjab region, hence giving it the name Majha. It includes a considerable portion of the Bari Doab (the region between the rivers Beas and Ravi) and the Rechna Doab (the region between the rivers Ravi and Chenab), and a smaller portion of the Jech Doab region (the region between the rivers Jhelum and Chenab).

The Majha region of historical Punjab region spans northward from the right banks of river Beas, and extends up to river Jhelum at its northmost, making it the largest regions of historic Punjab.

The Indian state of Punjab has continued to recognize the Majha region through maintaining the districts that have historically belonged to the Majha region. In Pakistan, the Majha city of Lahore was selected as its provincial capital, which the remaining Majha districts were either maintained, or their borders blurred as the boundaries were divided between districts Bahawalpur, Dera Ghazi Khan,  Multan, and Rawalpindi, Sahiwal and Sargodha.

Districts of Majha
The following districts are classified as Majha.

Tourist attractions

India
 The Golden Temple, Amritsar

 Gurudwara Shaheed Ganj Sahib, Amritsar
 Baba Atal Sahib, Amritsar
 Maharaja Ranjit Singh Museum, Amritsar
 Company Bagh, Amritsar
 Gurdwara Sri Tarn Taran Sahib, Tarntaran 
Jallianwala Bagh, Amritsar
 Punjab State War Heroes' Memorial & Museum, Amritsar
 Bhagwan Valmiki Tirath Sthal, Amritsar
 Haveli, Amritsar
 Gurudwara Bir Baba Budha Sahib
 Gurudwara Goindwal Sahib, Tarntaran
 Ram Bagh Palace, Amritsar 
 Partition Museum, Amritsar
Harike Pattan bird sanctuary, Tarn Taran
Durgiana Temple, Amritsar
 Walled City of Amritsar
Gobindgarh Fort, Amritsar
 Mukteshwar Mahadev Temple, Pathankot
 Ranjit Sagar Dam, Pathankot
Shahpur Kandi Fort, Pathankot
Nurpur Fort, Pathankot
 Gurdwara Kandh Sahib, Batala
Shamsher Khan's tomb, Batala
Pul Kanjri, Amritsar
Wagah-Attari border ceremony, Attari border between Amritsar India and Lahore Pakistan.

Pakistan

Akbari Sarai, Lahore
Aiwan-e-Iqbal, Lahore
Anarkali Bazaar, Lahore
Badshahi Mosque, Lahore
Bagh-e-Jinnah (Lawrence Gardens), Lahore
Begum Shahi Mosque, Lahore
Chauburji, Lahore
Faisalabad Clock Tower, Faisalabad
Data Darbar, Lahore
Fakir Khana, Lahore
Gurdwara Darbar Sahib Kartarpur, Kartarpur
Gurdwara Dera Sahib, Lahore
Gurdwara Janam Asthan, Nankana Sahib
Gurdwara Janam Asthan Guru Ram Das, Lahore 
Haveli of Nau Nihal Singh, Lahore
Hazuri Bagh, Lahore
Hiran Minar, Sheikhupura
Lahore Fort (Shahi Qila), Lahore
Lahore Museum, Lahore
Lahore Zoo, Lahore
Minar-e-Pakistan, Lahore
Moti Masjid, Lahore
Neevin Mosque, Lahore
Omar Hayat Mahal, Chiniot
Oonchi Mosque, Lahore
Sacred Heart Cathedral, Lahore
Samadhi of Ranjit Singh, Lahore
Shahi Hammam, Lahore
Shalimar Gardens, Lahore
Sheesh Mahal, Lahore
Sunehri Mosque, Lahore
Tomb of Asif Khan, Lahore
Tomb of Jahangir, Lahore
Tomb of Allama Iqbal, Lahore
Tomb of Nur Jahan, Lahore
Wagah-Attari border ceremony, Attari border between Amritsar India and Lahore Pakistan.
Walled City of Lahore, Lahore
Wazir Khan Mosque, Lahore
Zamzama, Lahore

Notable residents Of Majha

Baba Deep Singh Ji (1682–1757).
Raja Aziz Bhatti (1928-1965) Got highest military award of Pakistan for his bravery
Lala Achint Ram - Noted freedom Fighter , Member of the Constitutional Assembly, Later Parliamentarian.
Maharaja Ranjit Singh of Punjab (1780–1839), the founder of the Sikh Empire.
Premchand Degra Bodybuilder from Gurdaspur.
Zubair Jhara Pehalwan (1990-1991) Famous Wrestler from Lahore
Krishan Kant - Former Vice President of India 
Hari Singh Nalwa (1791–1837), renowned warrior and Commander-in-chief of the Sikh Khalsa Army, the army of the Sikh Empire.
Haq Nawaz Jhangvi (1952-1990) Chief, Sipah-e-Sahaba Pakistan
Bhai Bidhi Chand (1640), the greatest Sikh warrior and religious preacher at the time of Guru Hargobind Sahib Ji.
Akali Phula Singh Ji (1761 – 1823), highly respected Akali Nihang Sikh general and Jathedar of the Khalsa Panth.
Rai Ahmad Khan Kharal, (1785-1857) He led rebellion against British army in Punjab
Sham Singh Atariwala (1790 - 1846), the general of the Sikh Empire.
Allama Iqbal, Pakistan's national poet.
Sohail Ahmed, Pakistani Comedian
Captain Arun Singh Jasrotia, India military officer.
Musarrat Nazir, Pakistani Punjabi folk singer of Kashmiri descent.
Saifuddin Kitchlew, Indian freedom fighter of Kashmiri descent.
Baba Baghel Singh, who occupied Delhi
Akshay Kumar
Dulla Bhatti (1549-1599) Led revolt against Mughal Emperor
Baba Gurdit Singh, SS Komagata Maru
Satyavati Devi (born 1905)
Raza Saqib Mustafai, Islamic Scholar
Bhai Maha Singh
Kapil Sharma
Sunanda Sharma, Famous Female-Punjabi Singer
Dara Singh wrestler
Gurdial Singh Dhillon, ex-speaker of Lok Sabha, India
Jagbir Singh Chhina, freedom fighter.
Gurpreet Singh (shooter), winner of two medals in Commonwealth Games, Delhi
M. S. Gill, former chief Election Commissioner of India and former sports Minister of India
Mai Bhago
Pratap Singh Kairon, ex-Chief Minister of Punjab
Surender Mohan Pathak, Novelist
Teja Singh Samundri, founder of SGPC
Baba Sohan Singh Bhakna, Founder and President of Gadar party
 Bharti Singh
Amrinder Gill
Dr. Jagir Singh Noor, from Batala, Writer, known for his contribution to culture, criticism and research on folk dances
 Sardar Baj Singh, Sikh general and governor.
Bhai Bhag Singh Bhikhiwind, leader of the Ghadar Party (1914)
 Sardar Chhajja Singh Dhillon, a renowned Sikh warrior of the early 18th century.
 Prem Dhillon
Jordan Sandhu
 AP Dhillon
Gurinder Gill
Nimrat Khaira
Ravi Thakur
Nusrat Fateh Ali Khan, Faisalabad
Bhagat Singh, (September 1907 – 23 March 1931)
Noor Jahan, Singer, real Name Allah Rakhi, Kasur

Photo gallery

See also
Doaba
Pothwar
Malwa
Poadh
Jech Doab
Rechna Doab

Notes

References

Regions of India
Regions of Pakistan
Regions of Punjab, India
Plains of India
Plains of Pakistan
Landforms of Punjab, India
Geography of Punjab, Pakistan